Jerome Baker may refer to:

 Jerome Baker (soccer) (born 1991), Canadian soccer player
 Jerome Baker (artist), American glass blower
 Jerome Baker (American football) (born 1996), American football player
 Jerome Baker (company), Las Vegas, Nevada based company in the cannabis industry

See also  
 Jerry Baker (disambiguation)